The Birmingham School of engravers emerged from the early Birmingham drawing academies of Joseph Barber and Samuel Lines in the early 19th century. By the 1850s and 1860s they were dominant figures in the art of line-engraving.

The Birmingham engravers enabled the expansion of the scope of illustrated books and magazines to include the works of artists such as J. M. W. Turner, greatly increasing the exposure of contemporary art.

Members
The existence of the Birmingham School as a distinctive group within the wider field of engraving was first recognised with the Exhibition of Engravings by Birmingham Men held at the Royal Birmingham Society of Artists in 1877. This exhibition featured work by the following engravers:

 James Baylie Allen
 Robert Brandard
 J. Goodyear
 William Radclyffe
 C. W. Sharp
 James Tibbets Willmore
 E. P. Brandard
 John Pye
 Thomas Garner
 J. Jeavons
 E. Radclyffe
 A. Willmore
 William Floyd
 S. Fisher

References

British art movements
Culture in Birmingham, West Midlands
English art
Engraving
British printmakers